William Pellington (September 25, 1927 – April 26, 1994) was an American gridiron football linebacker who played 12 seasons in the NFL for the Baltimore Colts. Known for his aggressive style and so-called neck-tie tackles, Pellington was a mainstay with the Colts teams that captured league championships in the 1958 and 1959 seasons.

Pellington lived in Ramsey, New Jersey. He died in 1994 as a result of complications from Alzheimer's disease.  His wife Milica "Micki" often accompanied him to games, while helping to raise their family in Timonium, Maryland.

His youngest son is film and music video director Mark Pellington. His older son, William "Bato" Pellington, is an industrial real-estate broker in Baltimore, at CB Richard Ellis.

Pellington also owned the Iron Horse restaurant in Timonium. Opened in 1963, it was famous for its large sizes portions of almost everything on the menu since it served many of the Colts players.

References

External links
 

1927 births
1994 deaths
American football linebackers
Rutgers Scarlet Knights football players
Sportspeople from Bergen County, New Jersey
Baltimore Colts players
People from Ramsey, New Jersey
Players of American football from New Jersey